The Royal Order of the Phoenix is an order of knighthood of the Kingdom of Tonga.

History 
The order was founded by King George Tupou V on 1 August 2010.

Order of the Phoenix of Rawaki Island

Classes 
The Order is awarded in one single class : Grand Cross (GCOP)

Insignia 

The Ribbon is orange.

References

Orders, decorations, and medals of Tonga